Kurnangki is a medium-sized Aboriginal community, located within the town of Fitzroy Crossing in the Kimberley region of Western Australia, within the Shire of Derby-West Kimberley.

History 

The Kurnangki "village" was designed and constructed by the community with the assistance of the State Housing Commission of Western Australia. The community was opened on 28 June 1985.

Governance 

The community is managed through its incorporated body, Kurnangki Aboriginal Corporation, incorporated under the Aboriginal Councils and Associations Act 1976 on 27 August 1979.

Town planning 

Kurnangki Layout Plan No.1 has been prepared in accordance with State Planning Policy 3.2 Aboriginal Settlements. Layout Plan No.1 was endorsed by the community on 24 February 2004 and the Western Australian Planning Commission on 8 April 2008.

References

External links 
 Office of the Registrar of Indigenous Corporations

Aboriginal communities in Kimberley (Western Australia)